Chengshousi Subdistrict is a subdistrict situated on the northeastern portion of Fengtai District, Beijing, China. It borders Fangzhuang Subdistrict to its north, Shibalidian Township to its east, Xiaohongmen Township to its south, and Shiliuzhuang Subdistrict to its west.

The subdistrict was created in 2021 from parts of Dongtiejiangying and Dahongmen Subdistricts, as well as part of Nanyuan Township. Its name Chengshousi is inherited from Chengshou Temple, a Buddhist temple that once existed in the area.

History

Administrative division 
In 2021, Chengshousi Subdistrict administered 6 subdivisions within its borders, of which 5 were communities and 1 was a village:

Gallery

See also 

 List of township-level divisions of Beijing

References 

Fengtai District
Subdistricts of Beijing